is a passenger railway station located in the city of Fussa, Tokyo, Japan, operated by East Japan Railway Company (JR East).

Lines 
Fussa Station is served by the Ōme Line, and is located 9.6 kilometers from the starting point of the line at Tachikawa Station.

Station layout 
This station consists of a single island platform serving two tracks.The station is staffed.

Platforms

History
The station opened on 19 November 1894. With the privatization of Japanese National Railways (JNR) on 1 April 1987, the station came under the control of JR East.

Passenger statistics
In fiscal 2019, the station was used by an average of 16,017 passengers daily (boarding passengers only).

The passenger figures for previous years are as shown below.

Surrounding area
 Fussa City Hall
 Yokota Air Base
 Seiyu Mall

See also
 List of railway stations in Japan

References

External links

JR East station information 

Railway stations in Tokyo
Railway stations in Japan opened in 1894
Fussa, Tokyo
Ōme Line